Mel Yannick Joel Agnero (born 20 February 2003) is an Ivorian professional footballer who plays as a forward for Danish 1st Division side Fremad Amager, on loan from Nordsjælland.

Club career

Early years
Agnero was born in Ivory Coast and was a part of the Right to Dream Academy before joining FC Nordsjælland in the summer 2021.

FC Nordsjælland
Agnero made his professional debut for Nordsjaelland on 22 October 2021 against Vejle Boldklub. In the summer 2022, Agnero was permanently promoted to Nordsjælland senior squad.

Fremad Amager (loan)
On transfer deadline day, 31 January 2023, Agnero joined Danish 1st Division side Fremad Amager on a loan deal for the rest of the season.

Career statistics

References

External links
 
 
 Footballdatabase Profile

2003 births
Living people
Ivorian footballers
Ivorian expatriate footballers
Association football forwards
Right to Dream Academy players
FC Nordsjælland players
Fremad Amager players
Danish Superliga players
Ivorian expatriate sportspeople in Denmark
Expatriate men's footballers in Denmark